Diego Paolini is an Italian slalom canoeist who competed at the international level from 1999 to 2013.

He won two medals in the K1 team event at the ICF Canoe Slalom World Championships with a silver in 2006 and a bronze in 2010. He also won a silver and a bronze medal at the European Championships.

World Cup individual podiums

1 European Championship counting for World Cup points

References

  - accessed 12 September 2010.
 

Italian male canoeists
Living people
Year of birth missing (living people)
Medalists at the ICF Canoe Slalom World Championships
21st-century Italian people